The global spread of the printing press began with the invention of the printing press with movable type by Johannes Gutenberg in Mainz, Germany . Western printing technology was adopted in all world regions by the end of the 19th century, displacing the manuscript and block printing.

In the Western world, the operation of a press became synonymous with the enterprise of publishing and lent its name to a new branch of media, the "press" (see List of the oldest newspapers).

Spread of the Gutenberg press

Germany 

Gutenberg's first major print work was the 42-line Bible in Latin, printed probably between 1452 and 1454 in the German city of Mainz. After Gutenberg lost a lawsuit against his investor, Johann Fust, Fust put Gutenberg's employee Peter Schöffer in charge of the print shop. Thereupon Gutenberg established a new one with the financial backing of another money lender. With Gutenberg's monopoly revoked, and the technology no longer secret, printing spread throughout Germany and beyond, diffused first by emigrating German printers, but soon also by foreign apprentices.

Europe 
In rapid succession, printing presses were set up in Central and Western Europe. Major towns, in particular, functioned as centers of diffusion (Cologne 1466, Rome 1467, Venice 1469, Paris 1470, Kraków 1473, London 1477). In 1481, barely 30 years after the publication of the 42-line Bible, the small Netherlands already featured printing shops in 21 cities and towns, while Italy and Germany each had shops in about 40 towns at that time. According to one estimate, "by 1500, 1000 printing presses were in operation throughout Western Europe and had produced 8 million books" and during the 1550s there were "three hundred or more" printers and booksellers in Geneva alone. The output was in the order of twenty million volumes and rose in the sixteenth century tenfold to between 150 and 200 million copies.  Germany and Italy were considered the two main centres of printing in terms of quantity and quality.

Rest of the world 

The near-simultaneous discovery of sea routes to the West (Christopher Columbus, 1492) and East (Vasco da Gama, 1498) and the subsequent establishment of trade links greatly facilitated the global spread of Gutenberg-style printing.  Traders, colonists, but perhaps most importantly, missionaries exported printing presses to the new European oversea domains, setting up new print shops and distributing printing material.  In the Americas, the first extra-European print shop was founded in Mexico City in 1544 (1539?), and soon after Jesuits started operating the first printing press in Asia (Goa, 1556).

For a long time, however, movable type printing remained mainly the business of Europeans working from within the confines of their colonies. According to Suraiya Faroqhi, lack of interest and religious reasons were among the reasons for the slow adoption of the printing press outside Europe: Thus, printing in the Arabic script, after encountering strong opposition by Muslim legal scholars and manuscript scribes, remained formally or informally prohibited in the Ottoman Empire between 1483 and 1729, according to some sources even on penalty of death, while some movable Arabic type printing was done by Pope Julius II (1503−1512) for distribution among Middle Eastern Christians, and the oldest Qur’an printed with movable type was produced in Venice in 1537/1538 for the Ottoman market.

Hebrew texts and presses were imported across the Middle East - as early as 1493 - Constantinople, Fez (1516), Cairo (1557) and Safed (1577). Disquiet among Muslims regarding the publication of religious texts in this way may have dampened down their production.

In India, reports are that Jesuits "presented a polyglot Bible to the Emperor Akbar in 1580 but did not succeed in arousing much curiosity." But also practical reasons seem to have played a role. The English East India Company, for example, brought a printer to Surat in 1675, but was not able to cast type in Indian scripts, so the venture failed.

North America saw the adoption by the Cherokee Indian Elias Boudinot who published the tribe's first newspaper, the Cherokee Phoenix, from 1828, partly in the Cherokee language, using the Cherokee script recently invented by his compatriot Sequoyah.

In the 19th century, the arrival of the Gutenberg-style press to the shores of Tahiti (1818), Hawaii (1821) and other Pacific islands, marked the end of a global diffusion process which had begun almost 400 years earlier. At the same time, the "old style" press (as the Gutenberg model came to be termed in the 19th century), was already in the process of being displaced by industrial machines like the steam powered press (1812) and the rotary press (1833), which radically departed from Gutenberg's design, but were still of the same development line.

Dates by location 
The following represents a selection:

Germany, Austria and German printers in Central Europe

Rest of Europe

Italy 

In the 15th century, printing presses were established in 77 Italian cities and towns. At the end of the following century, 151 locations in Italy had seen at one time printing activities, of which 130 (86%) were north of Rome. During these two centuries a total of 2894 printers were active in Italy, with only 216 of them located in southern Italy. Ca. 60% of the Italian printing shops were situated in six cities (Venice, Rome, Milan, Naples, Bologna and Florence), with the concentration of printers in Venice being particularly high (ca. 30%).

Switzerland

France 

Apart from the cities above, a small number of lesser towns also set up printing presses.

Spain

Belgium

Netherlands 

In 1481, printing was already being done in 21 towns and cities.

Hungary 

In the 16th century, a total of 20 print shops were active in 30 different places in Hungary, as some of them were moving several times due to political instability.

Poland 

In the 15th and 16th centuries printing presses were also established in Poznań, Lwów, Brześć Litewski and Vilnius.

Czechia

England

Denmark

Sweden

Portugal

Croatia

Serbia and Montenegro 

By 1500, the cut-off point for incunabula, 236 towns in Europe had presses, and it is estimated that twenty million books had been printed for a European population of perhaps seventy million.

Scotland

Romania

Greece

Lithuania and Belarus

Iceland

Norway

Ireland

Russia 

Until the reign of Peter the Great printing in Russia remained confined to the print office established by Fedorov in Moscow. In the 18th century, annual printing output gradually rose from 147 titles in 1724 to 435 (1787), but remained constrained by state censorship and widespread illiteracy.

Latvia

Ukraine

Estonia

Finland

Georgia 

The first books printed in Georgian were Alphabetum Ibericum sive Georgianum cum Oratione and Dittionario giorgiano e italiano published in Rome in 1629.

Armenia 

The first book which had Armenian letters was published in Mainz (Germany) in 1486. The first Armenian book to be published by the printing press was Urbatagirq—Book of Friday prayers—which was published by Hakob Meghapart in Venice in 1512.

Greenland

Latin America

Mexico

Peru

Guatemala

Paraguay

Cuba

Colombia

Ecuador

Chile

Argentina

Puerto Rico

Uruguay

Brazil

Venezuela

Africa

Asia

South Asia

Ottoman Empire 

According to some sources, Sultan Bayezid II and successors prohibited printing in Arabic script in the Ottoman empire from 1483 on penalty of death, but printing in other scripts was done by Jews as well as the Greek, Armenian, and other Christian communities (1515 Saloniki, 1554 Bursa (Adrianople), 1552 Belgrade, 1658 Smyrna). Arabic-script printing by non-Muslims in the Ottoman Empire began with the press of Athanasius Dabbas in Aleppo in 1706. In 1727, Sultan Achmed III gave his permission for the establishment of the first legal print house for printing secular works by Muslims in Arabic script (Islamic religious publications still remained forbidden), but printing activities did not really take off until the 19th century.

Southeast Asia

East Asia

Iran

United States and Canada

Australia and Oceania

See also 
 Editio princeps
 Incunable

References

Sources

Further reading 
 
 
 

On the effects of Gutenberg's printing
 Eisenstein, Elizabeth L., The Printing Press as an Agent of Change, Cambridge University Press, September 1980, Paperback, 832 pages, 
 McLuhan, Marshall, The Gutenberg Galaxy: The Making of Typographic Man (1962) Univ. of Toronto Press (1st ed.); reissued by Routledge & Kegan Paul, 
 Febvre, Lucien & Martin, Henri-Jean, The Coming of the Book: the impact of printing 1450–1800, Verso, London & New York, 1990,

External links 
 Meyers Konversationslexikon, 4th edition, 1888–1890 
 The Atlas of Early Printing

History of printing
Information revolution
Technological change